Jailbreak or jailbreaking refers to a prison escape. It may also refer to:

Computer science
Jailbreak (computer science), a jargon expression for (the act of) overcoming limitations in a computer system or device that were deliberately placed there for security, administrative, or marketing reasons:
iOS jailbreaking, overriding software limitations on the iPhone, iPod Touch, or iPad
Hackintosh, Apple's Macintosh operating system macOS running on unauthorized computer hardware
Rooting (Android), on Android phones and tablets
PlayStation 3 Jailbreak, on the Sony PlayStation such as a developer firmware to override all system holdbacks

Music
'74 Jailbreak, a 1984 album by AC/DC
"Jailbreak" (AC/DC song), a 1976 song by AC/DC
Jailbreak (album), a 1976 album by Thin Lizzy
"Jailbreak" (Thin Lizzy song), the title track of the Thin Lizzy album
"Jailbreak" (Dev Pandya song), 199

Film and television
 Jailbreak (1936 film), a 1936 film, starring Barton MacLane and June Travis
 Jailbreakers, a 1994 television film, starring Shannen Doherty and Antonio Sabàto Jr..
 Jailbreak (TV series), a 2000 UK reality television series presented by Craig Charles
 Prison Break, 2005–2009, an American TV series
 "Jail Break" (Steven Universe), the 2015 final episode of the first season of the American animated television series Steven Universe
 Jailbreak (2017 film), a 2017 Cambodian action film, starring Jean-Paul Ly, Tharoth Sam and Céline Tran

Other
A variant of Tag
JailBreak, a 1985 arcade game by Konami
Jailbreak (webcomic), part of MS Paint Adventures
Jailbreak: Source, a 2007 multiplayer computer game modification of the Source game engine
Jailbreak (Roblox game), a 2017 cops and robbers video game on Roblox